Malparavu (also Île Mounparap, Île Matté Vulu) is a small uninhabited island in Sanma Province of Vanuatu in the Pacific Ocean.

Geography
Malparavu lies off the eastern coast of Espiritu Santo. The estimated terrain elevation above sea level is 15 meters.

References

Islands of Vanuatu
Sanma Province
Uninhabited islands of Vanuatu